Charles Capper (1822 – 21 March 1869) was a British Conservative Party politician. He was a Member of Parliament (MP) from 1866 to 1868.

He contested the borough of Sandwich at the 1865 general election, but was unsuccessful. However, he won the seat at a by-election in May 1866 after the resignation of the Liberal MP Lord Clarence Paget.  He held the seat until 1868, and did not stand again at the 1868 general election.

References

External links 
 

1822 births
1869 deaths
Conservative Party (UK) MPs for English constituencies
UK MPs 1865–1868
Place of birth missing